The South Somerset by-election was a Parliamentary by-election held on 21 November 1911. The constituency returned one Member of Parliament (MP) to the House of Commons of the United Kingdom, elected by the first past the post voting system.

Vacancy
Sir Edward Strachey the Liberal MP since 1892, was raised to the peerage as Baron Strachie, of Sutton Court in the County of Somerset and accepted ennoblement at start of November 1911 to join the House of Lords. This is in connection with the Parliament Act 1911, where many Liberal peers were created to overcome their relative deficit, a party having had renewed landslide political support of the people in the elected chamber.

Electoral history

Candidates

Henry Harvey Vivian, born in West Devon, was given the task of defending a seat that had been Liberal since it was created in 1885. He had been Liberal MP for Birkenhead until his defeat at the December 1910 general election.

The Conservative candidate was  Aubrey Herbert who had stood here unsuccessfully in both 1910 general elections. He was second son of the 4th Earl of Carnarvon, whose family owned a small part of the district, including Pixton Park, West Somerset, one of his permanent main homes. A soldier, diplomat, traveller, and intelligence officer, he was later associated with the Albanian independence movement. He was twice offered that nation's throne. He died in 1923, aged 43.

Campaign
The campaign seems to have fought mostly on the issue of the National Insurance Act. On 13 November, in a portent of things to come, the Unionists won a Liberal seat in a by-election at Oldham. Herbert entered polling day in a mood of great optimism

Result

Aftermath
A General Election was due to take place by the end of 1915. By the autumn of 1914, the following candidates had been adopted to contest that election. Due to the outbreak of war, the election never took place.
Unionist: Aubrey Herbert
Liberal: Henry Harvey Vivian
For the 1918 elections, the seat grew eastwards, reflecting urban population rise elsewhere since 1885, to become "Yeovil"

endorsed by the Coalition Government.

References

By-elections to the Parliament of the United Kingdom in Somerset constituencies
1911 in England
1911 elections in the United Kingdom
20th century in Somerset